Artem Viktaravich Gomelko (Belarusian: Арцём Віктаравіч Гамелько, ; 8 December 1989) is a Belarusian professional footballer who plays for LKS Jawiszowice.

Career

Club career
He made his Russian Premier League debut for Lokomotiv Moscow on 22 June 2011 in a game against CSKA Moscow.

International career
Gomelko was part of the Belarus U21 team that participated in the UEFA U-21 Championship 2009 and UEFA U-21 Championship 2011, but did not play in any matches, as Pavel Chasnowski and Alyaksandr Hutar respectively were selected as the starting goalkeepers.
Gomelko received his first call-up to the senior team of his country in March 2011 for a Euro 2012 qualifier against Albania and a friendly match versus Canada, but did not make an appearance in these games.

References

External links
 
 

1989 births
Living people
People from Zhodzina
Sportspeople from Minsk Region
Belarusian footballers
Belarusian expatriate footballers
Expatriate footballers in Russia
Expatriate footballers in Armenia
Expatriate footballers in Poland
Association football goalkeepers
Russian Premier League players
FC Lokomotiv Moscow players
FC Torpedo-BelAZ Zhodino players
FC Naftan Novopolotsk players
FC Granit Mikashevichi players
FC Slonim-2017 players
FC Smolevichi players
FC Lori players
FC Slutsk players